Bath Township, Ohio, may refer to:

Bath Township, Allen County, Ohio
Bath Township, Greene County, Ohio
Bath Township, Summit County, Ohio

Ohio township disambiguation pages